Haris Alihodžić  (born 12 April 1968) is a Bosnian football manager and former player who is currently working as an assistant manager at Bosnian Premier League club Željezničar.

Club career
For a big part of his career, Alihodžić played for hometown club Željezničar, with whom he won three Bosnian Premier League titles, three Bosnian Cup's and three Bosnian Supercup's. He also had brief spells with Rapid Wien and Favoritner AC in Austria, Antalyaspor in the Turkish Süper Lig and Mura in Slovenia.

International career
Alihodžić made his senior debut for Bosnia and Herzegovina in an October 2002 friendly match against Germany and has earned a total of 2 caps, scoring no goals. His final international was a March 2003 European Championship qualification match against Luxembourg.

Managerial and administrative career

Željezničar
After Edis Mulalić was sacked as manager, Alihodžić, who was the sporting director of Željezničar at the time, on 7 May 2016, took over as the caretaker manager of the  club until a new permanent manager was to be named. He led the team in one game, a 1–1 draw against Slavija Sarajevo in the last round of the 2015–16 Bosnian Premier League season.

On 12 July 2017, Alihodžić became the director of the youth academy of Željezničar. He worked as director until July 2022, when he was replaced by Edin Ćurić.

Bosnia and Herzegovina U21
On 6 March 2020, after Slobodan Starčević became the new head coach of the Bosnia and Herzegovina U21 national team, it was announced that Alihodžić, alongside Mario Ivanković, had been named as the new assistant coaches of Starčević.

Honours

Player
Željezničar 
Bosnian Premier League: 1997–98, 2000–01, 2001–02
Bosnian Cup: 1999–2000, 2000–01, 2002–03
Bosnian Supercup: 1998, 2000, 2001

References

External links

1968 births
Living people
Footballers from Sarajevo
Association football defenders
Yugoslav footballers
Bosnia and Herzegovina footballers
Bosnia and Herzegovina international footballers
FK Željezničar Sarajevo players
Favoritner AC players
SK Rapid Wien players
Antalyaspor footballers
NK Mura players
Yugoslav First League players
2. Liga (Austria) players
Austrian Football Bundesliga players
Süper Lig players
Slovenian PrvaLiga players
Premier League of Bosnia and Herzegovina players
Bosnia and Herzegovina expatriate footballers
Expatriate footballers in Austria
Bosnia and Herzegovina expatriate sportspeople in Austria
Expatriate footballers in Turkey
Bosnia and Herzegovina expatriate sportspeople in Turkey
Expatriate footballers in Slovenia
Bosnia and Herzegovina expatriate sportspeople in Slovenia
Bosnia and Herzegovina football managers
FK Željezničar Sarajevo managers
Premier League of Bosnia and Herzegovina managers